Rides may refer to:

 Amusement rides

Music
 Rides (album), by British band Reef
 The Rides, an American band

Television
 Rides (UK TV series), a drama produced by the BBC
 Rides (U.S. TV series), an automotive reality show produced for the TLC Network

See also
 Ride (disambiguation)